Antrodiaetidae, also known as folding trapdoor spiders or folding-door spiders, is a small spider family related to atypical tarantulas. They are found almost exclusively in the western and midwestern United States, from California to Washington and east to the Appalachian mountains. Exceptions include Antrodiaetus roretzi and Antrodiaetus yesoensis, which are endemic to Japan and are considered relict species. It is likely that two separate vicariance events led to the evolution of these two species.

Genera
, the World Spider Catalog accepted the following genera:
Aliatypus Smith, 1908 — United States
Antrodiaetus Ausserer, 1871 — United States, Japan
Atypoides O. Pickard-Cambridge, 1883 — United States
Hexura Simon, 1884 — United States

Name

The name “folding-door” describes how they open or close the entrance to their burrow; they unfold or fold the door.

See also
 List of Antrodiaetidae species

References

 Hendrixson, B.E. & Bond, J.E. (2005). Two sympatric species of Antrodiaetus from southwestern North Carolina (Araneae, Mygalomorphae, Antrodiaetidae). Zootaxa 872:1-19. PDF (A. unicolor, A. microunicolor)

External links

 Images of a folding trapdoor spider
 

 
Mygalomorphae families
Taxa named by Willis J. Gertsch